The yakka skink (Egernia rugosa) is a species of large skink, a lizard in the family Scincidae. The species is native to the Brigalow Belt in Queensland in eastern Australia.

It is listed as a vulnerable species under the Environment Protection and Biodiversity Conservation Act 1999.

References

Further reading

External links
 

Skinks of Australia
Egernia
Endemic fauna of Australia
Reptiles of Queensland
Taxa named by Charles Walter De Vis
Reptiles described in 1888